Gladioserratus is an extinct genus of cow shark. It contains three species:

Gladioserratus aptiensis Pictet, 1865
Gladioserratus magnus Underwood, Goswami, Prasad, Verma & Flynn, 2011
Gladioserratus dentatus Guinot, Cappetta & Adnet, 2014

The authors of its description considered it to be an exclusively Cretaceous genus, containing species living from Hauterivian to Cenomanian. Subsequently the species G. dentatus was described from the Valanginian of France. Teeth described by Adolfssen and Ward (2015), collected from the middle Danian Faxe Formation at Faxe, Denmark, extend the temporal range of the genus to Paleocene; according to the authors, the species "Notorynchus" serratissimus Agassiz (1843) should probably be assigned to the genus Gladioserratus as well, which, if confirmed, would further extended the temporal range of the genus to the early Eocene.

References

Hexanchidae
Cretaceous sharks
Prehistoric fish of Europe
Shark genera
Fossil taxa described in 2011